Raquel Kops-Jones and Abigail Spears were the defending champions, but decided not to participate this year.

Tatjana Malek and Kristina Mladenovic won the title, defeating Alicja Rosolska and Heather Watson 7–6(7–5), 6–7(6–8), [10–7] in the final.

Seeds

Draw

References
Main Draw

Challenge Bell
Tournoi de Québec
Can